Syntozyga anconia is a species of moth of the family Tortricidae. It is found in Australia, where it has been recorded from Queensland and New South Wales.

The wingspan is about 11 mm. The forewings are whitish, with fuscous irroration and markings, as well as numerous dark-fuscous strigulae (fine streaks) on the costa. The hindwings are grey.

References

Moths described in 1911
Bactrini